L’altra domenica ("Another Side of Sunday") was an Italian Sunday afternoon variety show, broadcast on Rai 2 between 1976 and 1979.

Created and hosted by Renzo Arbore, it was inspired by Arbore's radio program Alto gradimento. During its first season, the program alternated serious football reports with variety show, then from the second season it focused on humor. Its cast included Roberto Benigni playing a surrealistic cinematographic critic, Andy Luotto, Maurizio Nichetti (who also cured with Guido Manuli some animated segments), the trans-gender musical group Sorelle Bandiera, whose song "Fatti più in là" they launched in the show became a hit, Giorgio Bracardi and Milly Carlucci.  Isabella Rossellini, Mario Marenco and Michel Pergolani cured semi-serious live reports from New York City, Rome and London. The show was the first Italian live program to use telephone to interact with its audience, in this case through a humorous quiz. It was referred to as "a breath of fresh air for the intelligent and the curious" and "a monument in Italian television history".

References

1976 Italian television series debuts
1979 Italian television series endings
Italian television shows
RAI original programming
1970s Italian television series